Sophronica subdivisa is a species of beetle in the family Cerambycidae. It was described by Stephan von Breuning in 1940.

Subspecies
 Sophronica subdivisa invitticollis Breuning, 1976
 Sophronica subdivisa subdivisa Breuning, 1940

References

Sophronica
Beetles described in 1940